This article is about the particular significance of the year 1993 to Nigeria and its people.

Incumbents

Federal government 
 Head of State: 
 Until 26 August: Ibrahim Babangida
 26 August–17 November: Ernest Shonekan
 Starting 17 November: Sani Abacha
 Chief of General Staff:
 Until 26 August: Augustus Aikhomu
 26 August–17 November: vacant
 Starting 17 November: Oladipo Diya
 Chief of Defence Staff: Sani Abacha (Until 17 November); Oladipo Diya (Starting 17 November)
 Chief Justice: Mohammed Bello

Governors 
 Adamawa State: 
 Akwa Ibom State: 
 Anambra State: 
 Bendel State: 
 Benue State: 
 Borno State: 
 Cross River State: 
 Delta State: 
 Edo State: 
 Gongola State: 
 Imo State: 
 Jigawa State: 
 Kaduna State: 
 Kano State: 
 Katsina State: 
 Kebbi State: 
 Kogi State: 
 Kwara State: 
 Lagos State: 
 Niger State: 
 Ogun State: 
 Osun State: 
 Oyo State:
 Taraba State: 
 Yobe State:

Events

June 12, 1993 — MKO Abiola wins the Presidential election; President Ibrahim Babangida annuls the election.
August 26, 1993 — President Ibrahim Babangida steps down due to pressure from the Armed Forces Ruling Council. Ernest Shonekan assumes the reins of power as the Interim Head of State.
November 17, 1993 — Ernest Shonekan is forced to resign from office. Defence Minister, Sani Abacha becomes Head of State, and establishes the Provisional Ruling Council of Nigeria.

Births

January 1 – Michael Olaitan, footballer
May 1 – Ifeoma Nwoye, wrestler
December 10 - Odunayo Adekuoroye, wrestler

References

 
Years of the 20th century in Nigeria
Nigeria